( ) is a 2003 silent film directed by Morgan Fisher.

Summary
The film consists entirely of insert shots extracted from feature films, considering the "status of the insert shot in an ingenious way", according to film expert Susan Oxtoby.

Fisher said of his film, "Inserts are above all instrumental. They have a job to do, and they do it; and they do little, if anything, else. Sometimes inserts are remarkably beautiful, but this beauty is usually hard to see because the only thing that registers is the news, the expository information, that the insert conveys... By chance, I learned that the root of 'parenthesis' is a Greek word that means the act of inserting. And so I was given the title of the film."

Synopsis
P. Adams Sitney, Professor of Visual Art at Princeton University, wrote a short essay for Artforum International "Medium Shots: the films of Morgan Fisher" in which he describes the film "()." "Fisher's most recent film,, succeeds astonishingly where Frampton's parallel effort, Hapax Legomena: Remote Control (1972) failed; it uses aleatory methods to release the narrative unconscious of a set of randomly selected films. is made up entirely of "inserts" from feature films organized according to Oulipian principles. Inserts were usually shot by assistants when star actors, large crews, or expensive sets were not needed. These include details of weapons, wounds, letters, signs, tombstones, machinery, games of chance, timepieces, money, and even intimate caresses. Fisher culled the inserts from a number of films he collected for that purpose and edited them together under constraints he does not fully reveal; he places the inserts from a given film in the order in which they appeared in that film, but two inserts from the same film never follow each other directly in his assemblage. Alternating among them we catch glimpses of violence, intrigue, high-stakes gambling, and sexual adventure."

Screening
( ) was screened on October 18, 2003, during the New York Film Festival, and on September 13, 2004, at the 2004 Toronto International Film Festival as part of the Wavelengths programming.

References

External links

2000s avant-garde and experimental films
2003 short films
2003 films
American avant-garde and experimental films
American independent films
American silent short films
American black-and-white films
2003 independent films
Collage film
2000s American films